The Fox is a pub in the Holgate area of York, in England.

The pub was purpose-built in 1878, replacing an earlier pub on the site.  The Holgate Road carriage works was built nearby a few years later, and it long provided the main source of patrons for the business.  It was long owned by Tetley's Brewery.  In 1985, it was restored under the architect George Williamson, and was then branded as a Tetley's Heritage Pub.  It was grade II listed in 1994, following a study by the Campaign for Real Ale.

The pub was later sold to Punch Taverns, but closed in 2013 after the rent was increased.  A proposal to bring the pub into community ownership suggested opening a post office in the building and selling bacon sandwiches during the day, but this was not taken forward.  Instead, it was leased to the Ossett Brewery, which removed the kitchen and children's play area, and redecorated throughout.  Each of the four rooms has a different theme: foxes, Holgate, travel, and railways.  One room aims to replicate the feel of a railway carriage.  On opening, the pub offered nine cask ales, including several from Ossett.  By 2022, the pub was listed in the Good Beer Guide.

The two-storey building is built of brick, and is three bays wide.  A panel in the centre reads "THE FOX INN REBUILT 1878".  The main entrance is through a brick porch, while a secondary entrance, formerly for off-sales, is now blocked.  Inside, many original fittings survive, including the bar, benches, fireplaces, corridor hatch, and staircase.  It is listed on CAMRA's Yorkshire Regional Inventory of Historic Pub Interiors.

References

Buildings and structures completed in 1878
Grade II listed pubs in York